Buckhead is a train station in Atlanta, Georgia, serving the Red Line of the Metropolitan Atlanta Rapid Transit Authority (MARTA) rail system. This station is the first station only served by the Red Line.  It is located in the Buckhead neighborhood in the median of State Route 400, a limited access highway, at Peachtree Road/State Route 141. The station is in easy walking distance of many offices, hotels and shopping centers, including Lenox Square, although the Lenox MARTA station provides easier access to the mall.  The buc, a zero-fare bus service, also provides transportation to the surrounding area. The Buckhead Station also features Zipcars.

Station layout

History
Buckhead was opened on June 8, 1996, the same day as Medical Center Station and Dunwoody Station. When State Route 400 was being constructed south of the perimeter in 1993, space was left that allowed track to be laid in the median from Buckhead all the way to Medical Center.  In 2014, new pedestrian bridges were built across both sides of State Route 400, allowing better access to the Stratford on the east and Tower Place on the west. 

In 2023, from February 17th to the 22nd, Buckhead Station was disconnected from the system due to track replacement at the track switch just north of the station. The station was serviced by a local shuttle that maintained the connection between Lenox (Gold Line) and Medical Center (Red Line) stations. The station faregates were left open, but no trains were in service.

Nearby landmarks and popular destinations
 Atlanta Financial Center
 Capital City Plaza
 Buckhead Business District
 Buckhead Station Shopping Center
 Phipps Plaza
 Lenox Square

Bus routes
The station is served by the following MARTA bus routes:
 Route 110 - Peachtree Road / Buckhead

Connections to other transit systems
 Buc Shuttle - connects commuters to nearby housing, offices, and shops

References

External links
Station Overview, including video tour
MARTA Guide
Buckhead Information
Peachtree Road/State Route 141 entrance from Google Maps Street View

Red Line (MARTA)
Metropolitan Atlanta Rapid Transit Authority stations
Railway stations in the United States opened in 1996
Zero-fare transport services
Railway stations in Atlanta
1996 establishments in Georgia (U.S. state)
Railway stations in highway medians